Maria Sharapova was the defending champion, but withdrew due to a shoulder injury.

Caroline Garcia won the title, defeating Karolína Plíšková in the final, 7–6(9–7), 6–3.

Seeds

Draw

Finals

Top half

Bottom half

Qualifying

Seeds

Qualifiers

Draw

First qualifier

Second qualifier

Third qualifier

Fourth qualifier

Fifth qualifier

Sixth qualifier

External links
Main Draw
Qualifying Draw

Tianjin Open - Singles
Tianjin Open